Theoretician may refer to:
 A person associated with the theory (as opposed to practical aspects) of a subject
 A social theorist, a theoretician in the social sciences
 Theoretician (Marxism), term used in Marxism
 Theoretician (chess), someone who writes about the theory of the game of chess